The discography of Puddle of Mudd, an American alternative rock band from Kansas City, Missouri, formed in 1992 by Wes Scantlin (lead vocals, rhythm guitar). They released their first studio album in 1997; their major label debut, 2001's Come Clean, has sold over 5 million copies. They have released one independent and five studio albums, with their latest being Welcome to Galvania in September 2019. The band has sold over 7 million albums.

Albums

Studio albums

Cover albums

Video albums

Compilation albums

EPs

Singles

Music videos

Notes

 A. Peaked on the Bubbling Under Hot 100 Singles chart, a 25-song extension to the original Billboard Hot 100 chart.

References

Discographies of American artists
Rock music group discographies
Discography